Ernest Simmonds Henry Parker (18 December 1913 – 1983) was an English professional footballer who played in the Football League for Bournemouth, Bristol Rovers, Crystal Palace and Mansfield Town.

References

1913 births
1983 deaths
English footballers
Association football forwards
English Football League players
Crystal Palace F.C. players
Mansfield Town F.C. players
AFC Bournemouth players
Bristol Rovers F.C. players
Dartford F.C. players